The 1935 Cal Poly Mustangs football team represented California Polytechnic School—now known as California Polytechnic State University, San Luis Obispo—as an independent during the 1935 college football season. Led by third-year head coach Howie O'Daniels, Cal Poly compiled a record of 5–2–1. The team outscored its opponents 92 to 35 for the season and had four shutout wins. The Mustangs played home games at Mustang Stadium in San Luis Obispo, California.

Cal Poly was a two-year school until 1941 and competed as an independent from 1929 to 1945.

Schedule

Notes

References

Cal Poly
Cal Poly Mustangs football seasons
Cal Poly Mustangs football